Strašín is a municipality and village in Klatovy District in the Plzeň Region of the Czech Republic. It has about 300 inhabitants.

Administrative parts
Villages and hamlets of Maleč, Nahořánky, Věštín and Zuklín are administrative parts of Strašín.

Notable people
Karel Raška (1909–1987), epidemiologist

References

Villages in Klatovy District